Abdul Rahman bin Ibrahim (born 31 October 1954), also sometimes referred to as Pehin Dato Abdul Rahman, is a Bruneian politician whom formerly held the position of Minister of Finance II from 2005 to 2018 and Minister at the Prime Minister's Office from 2015 to 2018. Moreover, he is also a member of the board of directors of Brunei Investment Agency (BIA) from 2001 to 2003; deputy chairman of the board of directors of the Sustainability Fund; board member of the Authoriti Monetari Brunei Darussalam (AMBD); board member of the Sultan Haji Hassanal Bolkiah Foundation.

Biography

Early life and education 
Abdul Rahman is born on 31 October 1954 at Kampong Peramu of Kampong Ayer, and attended both primary and secondary education at Sultan Omar Ali Saifuddien College prior to pursuing higher education at the University of Hull in the United Kingdom, where he earned a BSc in Economics (Hons) in 1978. In 1986, the Arthur D. Little School of Management in the United States granted him a Certificate of Professional Studies. In 1996, he participated in a Senior management program at the London Business School in the United Kingdom.

Career

Early career 
Prior to Abdul Rahman's ministerial role, he had held several early positions such as an economic officer in the State Secretariat's Economic Planning Unit (EPU) on 14 September 1978; a Special Duties Officer at the Ministry of Development and as a personal assistant to the then Minister of Development on 12 March 1984; a Senior Administrative Officer Group 2 on 1 October 1986; a Senior Administrative Officer Superscale C in June 1989; the head of Financial Regulations Unit in the Ministry of Development on 6 August 1990; the director of Financial Institutions in the Ministry of Finance in 1992; the director of the Economic Planning Unit in the Ministry of Finance in May 1995; the director of Budget in the Ministry of Finance on 7 September 1998; the permanent secretary at the Ministry of Industry and Primary Resources ion 12 May 2000; the permanent secretary at the Ministry of Finance in 2001; and the acting managing director of the Brunei Investment Agency (2001).

Ministerial career 
Before being elevated to the position of Minister of Finance II on 24 May 2005, Abdul Rahman was appointed as the Deputy Minister of Finance in September 2004. During the 2010 and 2015 cabinet reshuffles, he remained at his post until being succeeded by Amin Liew Abdullah on 30 January 2018. From 18 to 25 May 2014, he would be in Singapore as the 43rd Lee Kuan Yew Exchange Fellow (LKYEF). The fourth Bruneian Lee Kuan Yew Exchange Fellow was Pehin Rahman. Pehin Rahman would be accompanied by representatives of the Bruneian Prime Minister's Office and Ministry of Finance. Additionally, he also served as the Minister at the Prime Minister's Office from 22 October 2015 until 27 September 2018. Later on 6 March 2016, In the Preamble to the Spending Budget, Abdul Rahman discussed the Ministry of Defense's priorities and areas of focus for the 2017–2018 fiscal year. During the third day of the first meeting of the 13th Legislative Council Meeting Season, which was held in the Council Chamber.

Post-Ministerial career 
On 20 January 2023, it was announced that Pehin Abdul Rahman would be part of the titled persons appointed into the new Legislative Council of Brunei.

Personal life 
In 1977, Pehin Dato Abdul Rahman wed Datin Sapiah binti Haji Sabtu. They have three sons and two daughters.

Honours
Abdul Rahman was given the title of Yang Dimuliakan (His Excellency) Pehin Orang Kaya Laila Setia. Moreover, he has been awarded the following honours;

  Order of Setia Negara Brunei First Class (PSNB) – Dato Seri Setia
  Order of Seri Paduka Mahkota Brunei Second Class (DPMB) – Dato Paduka
  Sultan Hassanal Bolkiah Medal (PHBS)
  Service to State Medal (PIKB)
  Long Service Medal (PKL)

References

Living people
1954 births
Finance ministers of Brunei
Alumni of the University of Hull
Hult International Business School alumni
Alumni of London Business School